= Charlie Smethams =

English footballer

Personal information
- Full name: John Charles Smethams
- Date of birth: 1886
- Place of birth: Congleton, England
- Position: Winger

Senior career*
Years	Team	Apps	(Gls)
1904–1906	Macclesfield	21	(1)
1907–1910	Burnley	60	(4)
1910–1911	Blackburn Rovers	3	(0)
	Southport Central	?	(?)
- * Club domestic league appearances and goals

John Charles Smethams (born 1886) was an English professional footballer who played as a winger.
